Fairy Tale about Father Frost, Ivan and Nastya (Czech: Pohádka o Mrazíkovi, Ivanovi a Nastěnce) is a 2000 Czech adventure game developed by Centauri Production and Bohemia Interactive. It was published by Bohemia Interactive.

Development 
The game is heavily inspired by the 1964 Soviet fairy-tale movie Jack Frost (Морозко). The authors of the game read over 1,000 original Russian and Czech fairy tales and legends to gain inspiration. 

The game was developed by Centauri Production with Bohemia Interactive providing motion-capture technology. The design style is hand-drawn animation, which were then modeled into the computer as 3D images. The game was meant to be released in October 2000, but this was postponed until mid-December with the final few weeks being spent finishing the voice overs. In cooperation with Bohemia Interactive, Bonusweb launched two competitions where entrants could win one of ten copies of the game. Due to the popularity of the game's soundtrack, four songs were released on Bonusweb in MP3 format.

Fairy Tale about Father Frost, Ivan and Nastya was included for free with the January 2009 issue of Počítač pro každého.

Critical reception 
Games.cz felt the game would appeal to children because it was simple, clear, nice, and interesting. Just Adventure felt the title would appeal to players who looked for mild cartoon violence and minimal stress in their adventure games. Gry Online felt the developers had crafted an eye-catching, cartoonish visual setting. At the time Bonusweb deemed it the best Czech adventure game ever created, and the most technologically advanced adventure ever. Adventure Gamers disliked the repetitive fetch quests and one-note characters. Doupě said the game enjoyably extends the narrative of the film.

References

External links 
Fairy Tale about Father Frost, Ivan and Nastya at MobyGames
Official website via Internet Archive

2000 video games
Bohemia Interactive games
Fictional trios
Point-and-click adventure games
Single-player video games
Video games based on fairy tales
Video games developed in the Czech Republic
Windows games
Windows-only games